Morungen may refer to:
Heinrich von Morungen, medieval German minnesinger
Morungen (Sangerhausen), a village within the municipality/city Sangerhausen, Saxony-Anhalt, Germany
An alternative spelling of Mohrungen in Prussia, after 1945 Morąg, Poland